Islay is a hamlet in central Alberta, Canada within the County of Vermilion River. Previously an incorporated municipality, Islay dissolved from village status on March 15, 1944, to become part of the Municipal District of Vermilion Valley No. 482. The community was named after Islay, in Scotland, the ancestral home of pioneer settlers.

Its first school opened in 1907.

Demographics 

See also 
List of communities in Alberta
List of designated places in Alberta
List of former urban municipalities in Alberta
List of hamlets in Alberta

References 

Hamlets in Alberta
Designated places in Alberta
Former villages in Alberta
County of Vermilion River